The 1951 Utah State Aggies football team was an American football team that represented Utah State University in the Skyline Conference during the 1951 college football season. In their first season under head coach John Roning, the Aggies compiled a 3–5–1 record (2–4–1 against Skyline opponents), finished sixth in the Skyline Conference, and were outscored by opponents by a total of 183 to 161.

Schedule

References

Utah State
Utah State Aggies football seasons
Utah State Aggies football